Hocine Achiou (born April 27, 1979) is a former Algerian footballer.

Achiou was a member of the Algeria national team at the 2004 Africa Cup of Nations where he scored a wonderful individual goal against rivals Egypt.

Football career
Achiou started his playing career with ES Ben Aknoun before joining the junior ranks of USM Alger. He would eventually sign his first professional contract with the club. Achiou was an important member of the team's African Champions League run in 2003 and 2004. USM Alger made the final eight (group stage) in both those years and even made it to the semi-final in 2003 when they lost 3–2 on aggregate to eventual champions Enyimba FC.

He had numerous opportunities to join European clubs but the player could not agree on financial terms with the clubs. He had trials with Premiership-sides Fulham FC and Portsmouth FC and French clubs CS Sedan and FC Lorient. Hocine finally signed a one-year deal with Swiss club FC Aarau in the summer of 2006. He scored a goal in his first league game against FC St. Gallen. In the summer of 2007, he left FC Aarau after just one season and immediately joined his former team USM Alger. In January 2009, he joined JS Kabylie. َAfter six successful months, he returned to his former team USM Alger.  In the summer of 2011, he left USM Alger definitively to join ASO Chlef. In January 2013, he joined MC Oran. In the summer of 2013, he joined USM Bel-Abbès and he led him to return to the Algerian Ligue Professionnelle 1. In January 2016, he joined RC Arbaâ. In January 2017, he joined WA Boufarik.

International career
Achiou was part of the Algerian team that finished second in their group in the first round of the 2004 African Nations Cup behind Cameroon before being defeated by Morocco in the quarter-finals. Achiou had scored an important goal against Egypt in one of the group stage matches that was instrumental in helping Algeria reach the quarterfinals. Achiou also scored a goal against Zimbabwe which would be the difference in the tie-breaker against Egypt, and ultimately qualify Algeria to the quarter-finals. Achiou has 25 caps for the Algerian national team and has scored 3 goals.

Career statistics

Club

National team statistics

Honours

As a player
USM Alger
 Algerian Ligue Professionnelle 1 (3): 2001–02, 2002–03, 2004–05
 Algerian Cup (3): 2000–01, 2002–03, 2003–04

References

External links
 

1979 births
Living people
Algerian footballers
Algeria international footballers
FC Aarau players
Swiss Super League players
Kabyle people
Footballers from Algiers
USM Alger players
MC Oran players
Algerian Ligue Professionnelle 1 players
Expatriate footballers in Switzerland
Algerian expatriate footballers
Algerian expatriate sportspeople in Switzerland
JS Kabylie players
ASO Chlef players
USM Bel Abbès players
2004 African Cup of Nations players
Association football midfielders
WA Boufarik players
21st-century Algerian people